Caecilia tenuissima is a species of caecilian in the family Caeciliidae. It is found in Colombia and Ecuador. Its natural habitats are subtropical or tropical moist lowland forests, plantations, rural gardens, and heavily degraded former forest.

References

tenuissima
Amphibians of Colombia
Amphibians of Ecuador
Amphibians described in 1973
Taxonomy articles created by Polbot